Bela Crkva Airport is an airport located near the town of Bela Crkva in Serbia, 4 kilometres west of the town railway station, in the village of Crvena Crkva.

Facilities include port and training flights of aircraft and gliders, parachute jumps. According to the NOTAM, this airfield does not fulfill the criteria for an airport as of May 2008.

Airports in Serbia